Gerd Natschinski (23 August 1928 – 4 August 2015) was a German composer. He worked on the scores for more than forty film and television series during his career. He was employed the East German state-controlled studio DEFA.

Natschinski died on 4 August 2015 in a Berlin hospital.

Selected filmography
 My Wife Makes Music (1958)
 Heißer Sommer (1968)

Selected operettas and musicals
 Messeschlager Gisela (1960, premiered at Metropol Theater Berlin)
 Servus Peter (1961)
 Mein Freund Bunbury (1964, premiered at Metropol Theater Berlin) based on The Importance of Being Earnest
 Casanova (1976, premiered at Metropol Theater Berlin)
 Caballero (1988)

Bibliography
 Marc Silberman & Henning Wrage. DEFA at the Crossroads of East German and International Film Culture: A Companion. Walter de Gruyter, 2014.

References

External links

Gerd Natschinski at schott-musik.de

1928 births
2015 deaths
German composers
People from Chemnitz
20th-century German musicians